Li Xuantong (born 18 February 2007) is a Chinese ice dancer. Along with partner Wang Xinkang, she is the 2022 Chinese National Championships silver medalist.

Career (With Wang)

Junior career

2022–23 season 
Li competed in the junior division of the 2022 Santa Claus cup, finishing in 4th place with a score of 134.45. Later in the Chinese junior figure skating championships, Li/Wang ranked second, after losing to Lin Yufei/Gao Zijian. He and Li participated in the 2023 Junior worlds championships, where they placed 22nd after the Rhythm Dance and did not qualify for the Free Dance.

Senior career

2022–23 season 
Li competed in the senior division of the 2022 Santa Claus cup, and finished in 7th place with a score of 148.09. She and Wang took the 2nd place at the 2022 Chinese Championships, after losing to another Harbin pair by 6.65 marks. Wang/Li are assigned to compete in the 2022/23 Chinese Figure Skating Champions Championships, which is scheduled to be held in Qingdao from 12–13 April 2023.

Programs

Competitive highlights 
With Wang

Detailed results
Small medals for short program and free skating are awarded only at ISU Championships. At team events, medals are awarded for team results only. ISU personal bests are highlighted in bold.

Senior level

Junior level

References

2007 births

Living people
Chinese female ice dancers
21st-century Chinese people